Doreen Baingana (born 1966) is a Ugandan writer and literary arts manager. Her short story collection, Tropical Fish, won the Grace Paley Award for Short Fiction in 2003 and the Commonwealth Writers' Prize for best first book, Africa Region in 2006. Stories in it were finalists for the Caine Prize in 2004 and 2005. She has received many other awards. She is the co-founder and director of the Mawazo Africa Writing Institute based in Entebbe, Uganda.

Early life and education
Raised in Entebbe, Doreen Baingana attended Gayaza High School and obtained a law degree from Makerere University and an MFA in creative writing from the University of Maryland, College Park. Immediately thereafter, she was appointed writer-in-residence at the Jiménez-Porter Writers House.

Career
Baingana won the Grace Paley Prize for Short Fiction in 2003 for her collection Tropical Fish. It was published by the University of Massachusetts Press and Broadway Books in the US, Oshun Books in South Africa, and Cassava Republic Press in Nigeria. It has been translated into Swedish and is forthcoming in French and Spanish in 2021. The linked stories, which explore the lives of three sisters growing up in Entebbe after the fall of Idi Amin, have been described by Publishers Weekly as "richly detailed stories" that are "lush with cultural commentary."

Baingana has published two children's books and short stories, essays, and articles in numerous journals and magazines including The African American Review, Chelsea, Glimmer Train, Callaloo, Agni, The Caravan: A Journal of Politics and Culture, Transition, The Guardian, Chimurenga, Kwani? and Farafina. Her stories have been broadcast on Voice of America and BBC and have been included in many anthologies including Gods and Soldiers: The Penguin Anthology of Contemporary African Writing; The Granta Anthology of African Fiction, Cultural Transformations (OneWorld), and New Daughters of Africa (edited by Margaret Busby, 2019).

Baingana was a contractor with Voice of America for a decade and taught at the Writer's Center, Bethesda, MD before returning to Uganda. She was a managing editor of Storymoja Africa, a Kenyan publisher, and chairperson of FEMRITE, the Uganda Women Writers Association. She co-founded and directs the Mawazo Africa Writing Institute and leads creative writing workshops across Africa.

The title story of Baingana's award-winning collection Tropical Fish has been adapted to the stage and performed at the Kampala International Theatre Festival (KITF 2016) and four other venues in Kampala, as well as the AfriCologne Theatre Festival in Cologne, Germany, in 2017. Another of Baingana's short stories, "Hills of Salt and Sugar", was adapted and staged at KITF 2018.

Baingana has been a judge for prizes including the 9mobile Prize for Literature, the Commonwealth Short Story Prize, the Golden Baobab Prize and the Hurston-Wright Prize for Debut Fiction.

Awards
2002: D.C. Commission of the Arts and Humanities Artist's Grant
2003: Grace Paley Award for Short Fiction
2004 & 2005: Caine Prize, finalist
2004: Bread Loaf Writers Conference Scholar
2004: Washington Independent Writers Fiction Prize
2005: Bread Loaf Writers Conference Michael and Marylee Fairbanks International Fellow
2006: Commonwealth Writers' Prize, Africa Region
2006: Hurston/Wright Legacy Award for Debut Fiction, finalist
2011: Norman Mailer Center Fellowship in Fiction
2014: Miles Morland Scholarship
2017: Rockefeller Bellagio Artist's Residency
2020:  Sustainable Arts Foundation Grant, finalist
2020: Tebere Arts Foundation Playwright Residency

Published works

Short-story collection

Children's books

Short stories

Non-fiction 

 "Scars", Crab Orchard Review, Winter 2002
 "Our Stories Aren’t All Tragedies", The Guardian, 2 August 2005
 "Encounters", The "O" Magazine, South Africa, February 2006
 A monthly column in the magazine African Woman, April 2006 to 2008
 "Lamu Lover", in It's All Love: Black Writers on Soul Mates, Family and Friends, Broadway Books/Doubleday, 2009
 "The Last Word", The African Report, December 2009
 “Hargeisa Snapshots”, African Cities II: Mobilities & Fixtures, 2011
 “Tuk-tuk Trail to Suya and Stars”, AGNI, September 2012
 “Why Write?” START, Journal for East African Arts and Culture, July 2013
 “Betty Oyella Bigombe” in When We Are Bold: Women Who Turn Our Upsidedown World Right, Nobel Women’s Initiative, 2016

References

External links
Jennifer Ludden, "A View of Contemporary Uganda in 'Tropical Fish'", NPR, 6 February 2005
Christina Lee, "Writer's Shock: Author Doreen Baingana Prepares to Pen a Travelogue From Memory", Washington City Paper, 18 November 2010.

1966 births
21st-century Ugandan women writers
Living people
Makerere University alumni
Ugandan short story writers
Ugandan women short story writers
Ugandan women writers
University of Maryland Global Campus alumni